Vespers is an album by soprano saxophonist Steve Lacy recorded in 1993 and released on the Italian Soul Note label. The album features lyrics by Blaga Dimitrova.

Reception
The Allmusic review by Scott Yanow awarded the album four stars stating "lots of interesting tone colors and harmonies and consistently stimulating solos... Well worth exploring".

Track listing
All compositions by Steve Lacy
 "Multidimensional" - 6:59 
 "If We Come Close" - 8:25 
 "Grass" - 9:24 
 "Wait for Tomorrow" - 4:35 
 "Across" - 5:58 
 "I Do Not Believe" - 9:26 
 "Vespers" - 6:15
Recorded at Sear Sound in New York City on July 5, 6, 7 & 9, 1993

Personnel
Steve Lacy - soprano saxophone
Steve Potts - alto saxophone, soprano saxophone
Tom Varner - French horn
Ricky Ford - tenor saxophone
Bobby Few - piano
Jean-Jacques Avenel - bass
John Betsch -  drums
Irene Aebi - voice

References

1993 albums
Steve Lacy (saxophonist) albums
Black Saint/Soul Note albums